The 2021 Masters Tournament was the 85th edition of the Masters Tournament and the first of the men's four major golf championships held in 2021. It was held from April 8–11, 2021, at the Augusta National Golf Club in Augusta, Georgia.

After the 2020 tournament had been postponed to November because of the COVID-19 pandemic and held behind closed doors, the 2021 edition returned to its traditional April dates and admitted spectators, although in reduced numbers and with social distancing measures in place. For the second year in succession, the traditional Par-3 contest was canceled due to these restrictions.

Hideki Matsuyama became the first Japanese male golfer to win a major championship, and the first Asian-born golfer to win the Masters, finishing with a 72-hole score of 278 (−10), one shot ahead of Will Zalatoris.

Course

Field
Participation in the Masters Tournament is by invitation only, and the tournament has the smallest field of the major championships. There were a number of criteria by which invites were awarded, including all past winners, recent major champions, leading finishers in the previous years' majors, leading players on the PGA Tour in the previous season, winners of full-point tournaments on the PGA Tour during the previous 12 months, leading players in the Official World Golf Ranking and some leading amateurs.

Criteria
This list details the qualification criteria for the 2021 Masters Tournament and the players who qualified under them; any additional criteria under which players qualified is indicated in parentheses.

1. All past winners of the Masters Tournament

Fred Couples
Sergio García (16,18,19)
Dustin Johnson (2,15,16,17,18,19)
Zach Johnson
Bernhard Langer
Sandy Lyle
Phil Mickelson
Larry Mize
José María Olazábal
Patrick Reed (12,16,17,18,19)
Charl Schwartzel
Adam Scott (18,19)
Vijay Singh
Jordan Spieth (3,16)
Bubba Watson (18)
Mike Weir
Danny Willett
Ian Woosnam

Past winners who did not play: Tommy Aaron, Jack Burke Jr., Ángel Cabrera, Charles Coody, Ben Crenshaw, Nick Faldo, Raymond Floyd, Bob Goalby, Trevor Immelman, Jack Nicklaus, Mark O'Meara, Gary Player, Craig Stadler, Tom Watson, Tiger Woods (18), Fuzzy Zoeller

2. Recent winners of the U.S. Open (2016–2020)

Bryson DeChambeau (15,16,17,18,19)
Brooks Koepka (4,12,16,18,19)
Gary Woodland (18)

3. Recent winners of the Open Championship (2016–2020)

Shane Lowry (18,19)
Francesco Molinari
Henrik Stenson

4. Recent winners of the PGA Championship (2016–2020)

Collin Morikawa (16,17,18,19)
Justin Thomas (5,12,16,17,18,19)
Jimmy Walker

5. Recent winners of the Players Championship (2018–2021)

Rory McIlroy (12,17,18,19)
Webb Simpson (12,16,17,18,19)

6. The winner of the gold medal at the Olympic Games

7. The winner and runner-up in the 2020 U.S. Amateur Championship

Ollie Osborne (a)
Tyler Strafaci (a)

8. The winner of the 2020 Amateur Championship

Joe Long (a)

9. The winner of the 2020 Asia-Pacific Amateur Championship

10. The winner of the 2021 Latin America Amateur Championship

11. The winner of the 2020 U.S. Mid-Amateur Golf Championship

12. The leading twelve players, and those tying for twelfth place, from the 2020 Masters Tournament

Corey Conners (19)
Dylan Frittelli
Im Sung-jae (17,18,19)
Pan Cheng-tsung
Jon Rahm (16,17,18,19)
Cameron Smith (17,18,19)

13. The leading four players, and those tying for fourth place, in the 2020 U.S. Open

Harris English (16,17,18,19)
Louis Oosthuizen (18,19)
Matthew Wolff (15,18,19)

14. The leading four players, and those tying for fourth place, in the 2020 Open Championship

15. The leading four players, and those tying for fourth place, in the 2020 PGA Championship

Paul Casey (18,19)
Jason Day (18,19)
Tony Finau (17,18,19)
Scottie Scheffler (17,18,19)

16. Winners of PGA Tour events from the originally scheduled date of the 2020
Masters Tournament (April 9, 2020) to the start of the 2021 tournament

Daniel Berger (17,18,19)
Patrick Cantlay (18,19)
Stewart Cink
Brian Gay
Jim Herman
Max Homa (19)
Billy Horschel (17,18,19)
Viktor Hovland (17,18,19)
Matt Jones
Kim Si-woo
Jason Kokrak (18,19)
Martin Laird
Kevin Na (17,18,19)
Carlos Ortiz (19)
Robert Streb
Hudson Swafford
Michael Thompson

17. All players who qualified for the 2020 Tour Championship

Abraham Ancer (18,19)
Cameron Champ
Lanto Griffin
Tyrrell Hatton (18,19)
Mackenzie Hughes (18,19)
Kevin Kisner (18,19)
Marc Leishman (18,19)
Hideki Matsuyama (18,19)
Sebastián Muñoz
Joaquín Niemann (18,19)
Ryan Palmer (18,19)
Xander Schauffele (18,19)
Brendon Todd (18)

18. The leading 50 players on the Official World Golf Ranking as of December 31, 2020

Christiaan Bezuidenhout (19)
Matt Fitzpatrick (19)
Tommy Fleetwood (19)
Matt Kuchar (19)
Victor Perez (19)
Ian Poulter
Justin Rose (19)
Matt Wallace
Lee Westwood (19)
Bernd Wiesberger (19)

19. The leading 50 players on the Official World Golf Ranking as of March 29, 2021

Brian Harman
Robert MacIntyre
Will Zalatoris

20. Invited international players

Round summaries

First round
Thursday, April 8, 2021

Justin Rose, twice a runner-up at the Masters, played his final 11 holes in 9-under, including an eagle at the par-5 8th, to begin the tournament with a round of 65 (−7). His four-shot lead after the first round was tied for second-largest in Masters history. It was Rose's fourth time holding the first-round lead at the Masters, tying Jack Nicklaus for the tournament record.

Defending champion Dustin Johnson opened with a two-over round of 74, ending his streak of 11 consecutive under-par rounds at the Masters, the longest in tournament history.

Will Zalatoris, making his Masters debut, eagled the par-5 15th and shot 70 (−2) to share fourth place. Jordan Spieth, the 2015 champion, chipped in for eagle on that hole and finished at one-under, in a tie for eighth place.

Tommy Fleetwood made a hole-in-one at the par-3 16th, the 32nd hole-in-one in the history of the Masters.

Second round
Friday, April 9, 2021

Justin Rose was three-over on his front-nine to see his four-shot lead at the beginning of the round disappear. He rebounded, though, with three birdies on the back-nine to shoot an even-par 72 and maintain a one-shot lead after 36 holes.

Masters rookie Will Zalatoris birdied his final three holes in a round of 68 (−4) to get into a tie for second place with Brian Harman, a shot behind Rose. Jordan Spieth made a 30-foot birdie putt on the 17th and was part of a tie for fourth place at 5-under. Justin Thomas birdied all three holes around Amen Corner and didn't make a bogey until the 18th hole to shoot 67 (−5) and jump into a tie for sixth.

54 players, scoring 147 (+3) or better, made the cut. Defending champion Dustin Johnson shot a three-over 75 and missed the cut by two strokes. Others to miss the cut included Rory McIlroy, who failed to make the weekend at the Masters for the first time since 2010, as well as 2020 runner-up Im Sung-jae. None of the three amateurs in the field made the cut for the first time since 2015.

Third round
Saturday, April 10, 2021

Hideki Matsuyama was one-under on his round and two shots off the lead playing the 11th hole when play was halted for 77 minutes by inclement weather. When play resumed, Matsuyama birdied the hole from the trees on the right. He also birdied the par-three 12th before hitting his second shot on the par-five 15th to six feet and making the putt for an eagle. Matsuyama hit his approach at the par-3 16th to four feet for another birdie. After getting up-and-down from over the green on the 18th, Matsuyama carded a seven-under 65 and the only bogey-free round of the week, opening up a four-shot lead entering the final round. He was the first Japanese player to hold the overnight lead after any round at the Masters.

Justin Rose, leader after the first two rounds, birdied his first two holes to take a three-shot lead. But he made only one more birdie the rest of the round to go with three bogeys and shot an even-par 72 to join a group of four tied for second place. Xander Schauffele birdied the par-5 13th and holed a 61-foot eagle putt on the 15th to shoot 68 (−4). They were joined in second place by Marc Leishman and Masters rookie Will Zalatoris.

Corey Conners made a hole-in-one on the par-3 sixth hole, the sixth on that hole in Masters history, but three-putted from 30 feet on the 13th after having a chance at an eagle and bogeyed the 14th. He came back with birdies on the 15th and 17th to shoot 68 and sit alone in sixth place, five shots behind. Jordan Spieth made four birdies but also double-bogeyed the seventh in an even-par round; he was six shots back in seventh place. Justin Thomas got within one of the lead after birdies on holes 2 and 3, but fell from contention after hitting his third shot on 13 into the tributary of Rae's Creek and making a triple-bogey 8.

Final round
Sunday, April 11, 2021

Summary
Hideki Matsuyama, who led by four shots entering the round, saw his lead cut to just one after he bogeyed the first hole while Will Zalatoris made birdie at the first and second. Matsuyama came back with three birdies on the front-nine and led by as many as six shots on the back-nine.

Xander Schauffele, tied with Zalatoris for second at the start of the day, birdied the seventh and eighth holes, then made four straight birdies from holes 12 to 15 to get within two of Matsuyama. At the par-3 16th, Schauffele hit his tee shot into the water and made triple-bogey, dropping him out of contention. He shot an even-par 72 and finished at 7-under for the tournament, three shots back in a tie for third.

Matsuyama, meanwhile, bogeyed the par-3 12th after failing to get up-and-down from a greenside bunker. After making a birdie on the par-5 13th when his tee shot ricocheted off a tree back into play, he hit his approach shot on the par-5 15th into the water over the green for another bogey. Zalatoris birdied the hole and left his second shot on the 17th six feet from the flag for another birdie to finish at 9-under following a round of 70. With a two-shot lead and two holes to play, Matsuyama two-putted for par on 17. At the 18th, he hit his second shot into the greenside bunker and missed a five-foot par putt but tapped in for bogey and a one-shot victory at 10-under. With the win, Matsuyama became the first Japanese player to win the Masters and the first Japanese male to win a major championship.

Final leaderboard

Scorecard

Cumulative tournament scores, relative to par
{|class="wikitable" span = 50 style="font-size:85%;
|-
|  style="background:Red;  width:10px;"|
|Eagle
|  style="background:Pink; width:10px;"|
|Birdie
|  style="background:PaleGreen; width:10px;"|
|Bogey
|    style="background:Green; width:10px;"|
|Double bogey
|    style="background:Olive; width:10px;"|
|Triple bogey+
|}

Notes

References

External links

.

2021
2021 in golf
2021 in American sports
2021 in sports in Georgia (U.S. state)
April 2021 sports events in the United States